A siege is a military blockade and assault of a city or fortress with the intent of conquering. For a list of sieges, see list of sieges.

Siege, The Siege, Besiege or Besieged may also refer to:

Books and comics

Fiction
The Siege (Dunmore novel), by Helen Dunmore, 2001
The Siege (Kadare novel), by Ismail Kadare, 1970
The Siege (Forgotten Realms novel), the second novel of the Return of the Archwizards trilogy by Troy Denning
Guardians of Ga'Hoole Book 4: The Siege, the fourth novel in the Guardians of Ga'hoole series
Siege (comics), a 2010 Marvel Comics storyline
Siege (character), a Marvel Comics character
The Siege: Selected Stories, a book by James Lasdun, including the title story, basis for the Bertolucci film
Siege, a 1924 novel by Samuel Hopkins Adams

Nonfiction
Siege (Mason book), an essay collection, and a newsletter, by the American neo-Nazi James Mason
Siege: Trump Under Fire, a 2019 book by Michael Wolff
The Siege: The First Eight Years of an Autistic Child, a 1967 book by Clara Claiborne Park

Film
Siege (1925 film), an American film
Siege (1940 film), a documentary short by Julien Bryan on the 1939 Siege of Warsaw
The Siege (1956 film), a Yugoslav war film directed by Branko Marjanović
Siege (1983 film) or Self Defense, a Canadian action thriller film
The Siege (1998 film), a film directed by Edward Zwick and starring Denzel Washington
Besieged (film), a 1998 film by Bernardo Bertolucci

Games
Siege (board game), a 1984 expansion of Cry Havoc by Standard Games
Siege (video game), a 1992 PC game developed by Mindcraft
Tom Clancy's Rainbow Six Siege, a 2015 game developed by Ubisoft
Besiege (video game), a 2020 physics building game

Television episodes
"Chapter 12: The Siege", 2020 episode of The Mandalorian
"The Siege" (Dead Zone)
"The Siege" (Star Trek: Deep Space Nine)
"The Siege" (Stargate Atlantis)

Other uses
The Siege (play), a 2002 Palestinian play by The Freedom Theatre
Siege (software), a Hypertext Transfer Protocol (HTTP/HTTPS) testing utility
Siege (band), a 1980s American punk band
Besieged (band), an American Christian band

See also
Siege Perilous (disambiguation)
Under Siege (disambiguation)